The 2023 Lees-McRae Bobcats men's volleyball team represents Lees-McRae College in the 2023 NCAA Division I & II men's volleyball season. The Bobcats, led by first year head coach Sam Albus, were picked to finish seventh in the Conference Carolinas coaches preseason poll.

Season highlights
Will be filled in as the season progresses.

Roster
{| class="toccolours" style="border-collapse:collapse; font-size:90%;"
|-
| colspan="7" style=background:#29574A;color:#FFFFFF; border: 2px solid #FFC72C; | 
|-
|-
|width="03"| 
|valign="top"|
Defensive Specialist/Libero
1 Ben Ratliff-Becher - Freshman
3 Isaac LaFunor - Sophomore
5 Steven Nalls - Senior

Middle Blockers
6 Nicholas Brewster - Junior 
10 Vincent Pradarelli - Freshman 
12 Sebastian Heer - Sophomore
15 Ace Backer - Senior

|width="15"| 
| valign="top" |
Outside Hitters
2 M.J. Doyle - Senior
4 Joe Angelo - Senior
6 Nicholas Brewster - Junior 
7 Michael Marsans - Senior
17 Thomas Couch - Sophomore
18 Austin Beaird - Freshman

|width="15"| 
| valign="top" |
Opposite Hitters
10 Vincent Pradarelli - Freshman 

Setters
11 Bradley Peters - Senior
18 Austin Beaird - Freshman'

|width="20"| 
|}

Schedule
TV/Internet Streaming information:
All home games will be streamed on Conference Carolinas DN. Most road games will also be televised or streamed by the schools television or streaming service.

 *-Indicates conference match.
 Times listed are Eastern Time Zone.

Announcers for televised games
Queens: No commentary''
Limestone: 
St. Andrew's: 
Grand Canyon: 
Grand Canyon: 
Park Gilbert: 
Erskine: 
Emmanuel: 
King: 
Fort Valley State: 
North Greenville: 
Barton: 
Mount Olive: 
Queens: 
Randolph-Macon: 
North Greenville: 
Belmont Abbey: 
Emmanuel: 
Erskine: 
Mount Olive: 
Barton: 
Belmont Abbey:
King:

References

2023 in sports in North Carolina
2023 NCAA Division I & II men's volleyball season
Lees-McRae